This is a list of shopping malls in North Macedonia.

References

Shopping malls
North Macedonia